The 1967 season was the Chicago Bears' 48th season in the National Football League.  The team improved on their 5–7–2  record from 1966 and finished with a 7–6–1 record and earning them a second-place finish in the newly formed Central Division within the NFL's Western Conference.  1967 also marked the final season with George Halas as the team's head coach.  Halas, one of the founders of the NFL, continued as the owner of the franchise until his death in 1983.

Offseason

NFL Draft

Roster

Regular season

Schedule

Season summary

Week 1

Week 2

Week 3

Week 4

Week 5

Week 6

Week 7

Week 8

Week 9

Week 10

Week 11

Week 12

Week 13

Week 14

Standings

Awards and records

Milestones

References

Chicago Bears
Chicago Bears seasons
Chicago Bears